"Sparrow" is a song by Scottish singer-songwriter Emeli Sandé. It was released on 15 March 2019 by Virgin EMI Records as the lead single from her third studio album, Real Life. "Sparrow" was written by Sandé primarily, with Laidi Saliasi credited as an additional songwriter. The track was produced by percussionist Troy Miller, with Sandé serving as a co-producer. The song, a power ballad with gospel influences, features lyrics which Sandé described as being inspired by the "intoxicating positivity" of Nigerian musician Fela Kuti.

Background and recording
Sandé sent demos of the song to producer Troy Miller, who she was familiar with due to his work with British musician Laura Mvula. Sandé referred to wanting a "militant, marching beat" prominent in the track. Miller wrote the string arrangements for "Sparrow", and recorded the instrumentation with the London Symphony Orchestra at Abbey Road Studios in London.

Release
The track was first announced through Sandé's Twitter account on 11 March 2019, four days prior to release. "Sparrow" was released on 15 March 2019 through British record label Virgin EMI Records, as the lead single from Sandé's upcoming third studio album. It was sent to radio formats that same day, and premiered through Zoe Ball's breakfast radio show on BBC Radio 2. On the same day, Sandé performed "Sparrow" live on 15 March 2019 at Elstree Studios for the charity telethon event Comic Relief.

Music video
The music video for "Sparrow" was released on 26 March 2019. The video, directed by Sarah McColgan and edited by Ernie Gilbert, was shot in New York City. According to Elle, the video "explores themes of strength, movement and freedom".

Credits and personnel
Credits adapted from YouTube, provided by Universal Music Group.

 Emeli Sandé – lead vocals, music production
 Troy Miller – music production, recording engineering, mix engineering, vocal arrangement, string arrangement, drums, piano, Hammond organ, Moog Taurus, baritone guitar
 Dani Spragg – recording engineering
 Robbie Nelson – recording engineering
 Jonathan Allen – recording engineering
 Miles Showell – mastering 
 Priscilla Jones-Campbell – background vocals, choir
 Subrina McCalla – background vocals
 Adeola Shyllon – background vocals
 Joy Farruka – choir
 Cherri Kirton – choir
 Phebe Edwards – choir
 Marsha Morrison – choir
 Heavily Sapong – choir
 James Thompson – choir
 Xavier Barnet – choir
 Jaz Ellington – choir
 Clare Duckworth – violin
 Ginette Decuyper – violin
 Laura Dixon – violin
 Gerald Gregory – violin
 Maxine Kwok-Adams – violin
 Claire Parfitt – violin
 Sylvain Vasseur – violin
 Julian Gil Rodriguez – violin
 Thomas Norris – violin
 Matthew Gardner – violin
 Belinda Mcfarlane – violin
 Iwona Muszynska – violin
 Csilla Pogany – violin
 Edward Vanderspar – viola
 Malcolm Johnston – viola
 Anna Bastow – viola
 German Clavijo – viola
 Carol Ella – viola
 Robert Turner – viola
 Rebecca Gilliver – cello
 Alastair Blayden – cello
 Noel Bradshaw – cello
 Eve-Marie Caravassilis – cello
 Daniel Gardner – cello
 Hilary Jones – cello
 Colin Paris – double bass
 Patrick Laurence – double bass
 Matthew Gibson – double bass

Charts

Release history

References

External links
 

2019 songs
2019 singles
2010s ballads
Emeli Sandé songs
Pop ballads
Soul ballads
Torch songs
Virgin EMI Records singles
Songs written by Emeli Sandé